State Highway 24 (SH 24) is a New Zealand state highway in the Waikato region. The highway was gazetted in 1997 and forms a short cut between the Matamata-Piako District and  towards the Port of Tauranga.

Route
After crossing the Kinleith Branch rail line and passing through the Matamata town centre the road changes to Mangawhero Road followed by Tauranga Road. After travelling in a south-east direction for approximately 8 km the road comes across a T-intersection. SH 24 traffic turns left while straight ahead traffic heads onto Te Poi Road, an undesignated road crossing  (further west than where SH 24 terminates) and eventually  towards Rotorua. SH 24 carries on eastwards to the intersection with SH 29 east of Te Poi. Eastbound traffic on SH 29 goes straight ahead (where SH 24 terminates), while westbound traffic makes a right turn.

See also
 List of New Zealand state highways

References

External links
New Zealand Transport Agency

24
Transport in Waikato